Save the Internet is a coalition of individuals, businesses, and non-profit organizations working for the preservation of Net neutrality. The site encourages taking action against discrimination of bandwidth distribution on the Internet.

History
Save the Internet was founded in April 2006 in order to advocate for net neutrality. When Save the Internet formed, it asserted the idea that network neutrality needed to be protected by a "First Amendment" of the Internet. As the First Amendment to the United States Constitution includes protection of freedoms of speech and of the press, so would a proposed Internet first amendment protect network neutrality, which would allow for equal access to every website.

January 14, 2014 - Court overturned the Federal Communications Commission's Net Neutrality due to a lawsuit by Verizon.

In September 2018, Article 13 has vote to success or reject. Many people have to save own internet. Many people chose reject, which means it is rejected.

On January 22, 2019, Article 13 is halted and rejected now.

Function
This online activist organization functions mainly as a source for public awareness and as a catalyst promoting civic action, such as petitioning Congress to support net neutrality. The website also runs a blog which keeps users up to date on threats to internet neutrality, amongst other things. Previous petitions garnered as many as 1.9 million signatures.

See also
Media democracy
National Conference for Media Reform
Telecoms Package

References

External links

Free Press
Network Neutrality FAQ by Tim Wu, Professor of Columbia Law School

Internet-related activism
Internet governance advocacy groups
Citizen media
Freedom of expression organizations